WebLOAD is load testing tool, performance testing, stress test web applications. This web and mobile load testing and analysis tool is from RadView Software. Load testing tool WebLOAD combines performance, scalability, and integrity as a single process for the verification of web and mobile applications. It can simulate hundreds of thousands of concurrent users making it possible to test large loads and report bottlenecks, constraints, and weak points within an application.

Using its multi-protocol support, WebLOAD simulates traffic of hundreds of thousands of users and provides analysis data on how the application behaves under load. WebLOAD monitors and incorporates statistics from the various components of the system under test: servers, application server, database, network, load-balancer, firewall, etc., and can also monitor the End User Experience and Service Level Agreement (SLA) compliance in production environments.

History 

WebLOAD was first launched in August 1997. Since its launch, RadView has released more than 20 versions of WebLOAD.

Features 
WebLOAD's features include:

 IDE An integrated development environment for visually recording, editing & debugging load test scripts. WebLOAD's proxy-based recorder records HTTP activity. Test are generated in JavaScript and can be enhanced and edited using various tools in the IDE.
 Correlation Automatic correlation of dynamic values such as Session IDs, enables a script to be executed dynamically with multiple virtual clients.
 Load Generation WebLOAD generates load from on-premises machines or from the cloud.
 Analytics A set of predefined analysis reports provides performance data, helping users identify bottlenecks. Reports and analysis data can also be viewed remotely via a customizable Web Dashboard.
 PMM Collects server-side statistics during test runs, providing users with additional data for root-cause analysis.
 Web Dashboard Analyzing performance test results from any browser or Mobile device.

See also 
Load testing
Cloud testing
Software performance testing
RadView Software
Soak testing
Stress testing
Web testing

References

External links 
 WebLOAD Homepage
  RadView Homepage
YouTube to MP3 Converters
Twitch Adblock

Load testing tools
Software testing tools